The Tryonicidae are a family of cockroaches.

Biodiversity and distribution
Two genera containing 17 species are currently confirmed as belonging to this family.

Table 1: Number of species of Tryonicidae in each region in which it is present (A=adventive, E=endemic, I=indigenous)

Notes
 Beccaloni & Eggleton's (2011) figures of '10 genera, 47 species' presumably does not take into account Murienne's (2009) publication (they do not cite it)
 According to Murienne (2009: 49), the tribe Methanini certainly belongs to the Blattidae: Polyzosteriinae, as probably does the group of New Caledonian endemic genera Angustonicus, Pallidionicus, Pellucidonicus, Punctulonicus, and Rothisilpha
 A report has been published of an unidentified endemic "tryonicine" from New Zealand, in addition to the adventive Tryonicus parvus, but details are too sketchy at present to accept this record.

References

Further reading
 Klass, K.-D.; Meier, R. 2006: A phylogenetic analysis of Dictyoptera (Insecta) based on morphological characters. Entomologische Abhandlungen, 63(1-2): 3-50. PDF
 McKittrick, F.A.; Mackerras, M.J. 1965: Phyletic relationships within the Blattidae. Annals of the Entomological Society of America, 58(2): 224-230. abstract only seen

External links

Cockroach families